The Baháʼí teachings represent a considerable number of theological, ethical, social, and spiritual ideas that were established in the Baháʼí Faith by Baháʼu'lláh, the founder of the religion, and clarified by its successive leaders: ʻAbdu'l-Bahá, Baháʼu'lláh's son, and Shoghi Effendi, ʻAbdu'l-Bahá's grandson. The teachings were written in various Baháʼí writings. The teachings of the Baháʼí Faith, combined with the authentic teachings of several past religions (Zoroastrianism, Hinduism, Judaism, Buddhism, Christianity, and Islam), are regarded by Baháʼís as revealed by God.

The Baháʼí teachings include theological statements about God, his prophets/messengers, and humanity, as well as ethical and social teachings including the equality of all human beings regardless of gender, race, nation, colour, or social class, the harmony of science and religion, gender equality, compulsory education, and the elimination of extremes of wealth and poverty, among others.

Summary

The most prominent and distinctive principles in the Baháʼí teachings are love and unity, which are exemplified by the Golden rule, and the many social principles.

Shoghi Effendi, the appointed head of the religion from 1921–1957, wrote the following summary of what he considered to be the distinguishing principles of Baháʼu'lláh's teachings, which, he said, together with the laws and ordinances of the Kitáb-i-Aqdas constitute the bed-rock of the Baháʼí Faith:
The independent search after truth, unfettered by superstition or tradition; the oneness of the entire human race, the pivotal principle and fundamental doctrine of the Faith; the basic unity of all religions; the condemnation of all forms of prejudice, whether religious, racial, class or national; the harmony which must exist between religion and science; the equality of men and women, the two wings on which the bird of human kind is able to soar; the introduction of compulsory education; the adoption of a universal auxiliary language; the abolition of the extremes of wealth and poverty; the institution of a world tribunal for the adjudication of disputes between nations; the exaltation of work, performed in the spirit of service, to the rank of worship; the glorification of justice as the ruling principle in human society, and of religion as a bulwark for the protection of all peoples and nations; and the establishment of a permanent and universal peace as the supreme goal of all mankind—these stand out as the essential elements [which Baháʼu'lláh proclaimed].

Unity
Three core assertions of the Baháʼí Faith, sometimes termed the "three onenesses", are central in the teachings of the religion. They are the Oneness of God, the Oneness of Religion and the Oneness of Humanity. They are also referred to as the unity of God, unity of religion, and unity of mankind.  The Baháʼí writings state that there is a single, all-powerful god, revealing his message through a series of divine messengers or educators, regarding them as one progressively revealed religion, to one single humanity, who all possess a rational soul and only differ according to colour and culture.  This idea is fundamental not only to explaining Baháʼí beliefs, but explaining the attitude Baháʼís have towards other religions, which they regard as divinely inspired.  The acceptance of every race and culture in the world has brought Baháʼí demographics diversity, becoming the second most widespread faith in the world, and translating its literature into over 800 languages.

The oneness of God

The Baháʼí view of God is essentially monotheistic. God is the imperishable, uncreated being who is the source of all existence.  He is described as "a personal God, unknowable, inaccessible, the source of all Revelation, eternal, omniscient, omnipresent and almighty". Though transcendent and inaccessible directly, his image is reflected in his creation.  The purpose of creation is for the created to have the capacity to know and love its creator.

In Baha'i belief, although human cultures and religions differ on their conceptions of God and his nature, the different references to God nevertheless refer to one and the same Being.  The differences, instead of being regarded as irreconcilable constructs of mutually exclusive cultures, are seen as purposefully reflective of the varying needs of the societies in which the divine messages were revealed.

The Baháʼí teachings state that God is too great for humans to create an accurate conception of.  In the Baháʼí understanding, the attributes attributed to God, such as All-Powerful and All-Loving are derived from limited human experiences of power and love. Baháʼu'lláh taught that the knowledge of God is limited to those attributes and qualities which are perceptible to us, and thus direct knowledge of God is not possible.  Furthermore, Baháʼu'lláh states that knowledge of the attributes of God is revealed to humanity through his messengers.

As our knowledge of things, even of created and limited things, is knowledge of their qualities and not of their essence, how is it possible to comprehend in its essence the Divine Reality, which is unlimited? ... Knowing God, therefore, means the comprehension and the knowledge of His attributes, and not of His Reality. This knowledge of the attributes is also proportioned to the capacity and power of man; it is not absolute.

While the Baháʼí writings teach of a personal god who is a being with a personality (including the capacity to reason and to feel love), they clearly state that this does not imply a human or physical form. The Baháʼí teachings state that one can get closer to God through prayer, meditation, study of the holy writings, and service.

The oneness of humanity

The Baháʼí writings teach that there is but one humanity and all people are equal in the sight of God.  The Baháʼí Faith emphasizes the unity of humanity transcending all divisions of race, nation, gender, caste, and social class, while celebrating its diversity.  ʻAbdu'l-Bahá states that the unification of mankind has now become "the paramount issue and question in the religious and political conditions of the world." The Baháʼí writings affirm the biological, political, and spiritual unity of mankind. Baháʼu'lláh wrote:

Ye are the fruits of one tree, and the leaves of one branch. Deal ye one with another with the utmost love and harmony, with friendliness and fellowship.

Regarding biological unity the Baháʼí writings state that differences between various races, nations, and ethnic groups are either superficial (e.g. skin colour) or the result of differences in background or education. A basic Baháʼí teaching is the elimination of all forms of prejudice, which refers to not only the elimination of racial prejudice but also that of other forms of prejudice such as gender discrimination.

The Baháʼí teachings state that while ethnic and cultural diversity will continue to exist, humanity's first allegiance will be with the human race rather than any subsidiary group such as race, nation, or ethnic group. There will be an end not only to war, but even to inter-group rivalry.

While the Baháʼí writings talk about the unity of the world and its peoples, unity is not equated to uniformity, but instead the Baháʼí writings affirm the value of cultural, national and individual diversity through the principle of "Unity in diversity," which states that while recognizing the unity of mankind, cultural diversity should be celebrated. Unity in diversity is commonly described in the Baháʼí writings through the analogy of flowers of one garden, where the different colours of the flowers add to the beauty of the garden.

It [the Faith] does not ignore, nor does it attempt to suppress, the diversity of ethnic origins, of climate, of history, of language and tradition, of thought and habit, that differentiate the peoples and nations of the world... Its watchword is unity in diversity...

The oneness of religion

The Baháʼí teachings state that there is but one religion which is progressively revealed by God, through prophets/messengers, to mankind as humanity matures and its capacity to understand also grows. The outward differences in the religions, the Baháʼí writings state, are due to the exigencies of the time and place the religion was revealed.   Baháʼu'lláh claimed to be the most recent, but not the last, in a series of divine educators which include Jesus, Buddha, Muhammad, and others.

The Baháʼí writings state that the essential nature of the messengers is twofold: they are at once human and divine. They are divine in that they all come from the same god and expound his teachings, and thus they can be seen in the same light, but at the same time they are separate individuals known by different names, who fulfill definite missions and are entrusted with particular revelations. Baháʼu'lláh in many places states that denying any of the messengers of God is equivalent to denying all of them, and God himself.  Regarding the relationships of these educators, which Baháʼís refer to as Manifestations of God Baháʼu'lláh writes:

God hath ordained the knowledge of these sanctified Beings to be identical with the knowledge of His own Self. Whoso recognizeth them hath recognized God. Whoso hearkeneth to their call, hath hearkened to the Voice of God, and whoso testifieth to the truth of their Revelation, hath testified to the truth of God Himself. Whoso turneth away from them, hath turned away from God, and whoso disbelieveth in them, hath disbelieved in God . . . They are the Manifestations of God amidst men, the evidences of His Truth, and the signs of His glory.

Progressive revelation

Baháʼís believe God to be generally regular and periodic in revealing His will to mankind through messengers/prophets, which are named Manifestations of God. Each messenger in turn establishes a covenant and founds a religion. This process of revelation, according to the Baháʼí writings, is also never ceasing, which is contrary to many other belief systems that believe in a finality of their prophet/messenger. The general theme of the successive and continuous religions founded by Manifestations of God is that there is an evolutionary tendency, and that each Manifestation of God brings a larger measure of revelation (or religion) to humankind than the previous one.  The differences in the revelation brought by the Manifestations of God is stated to be not inherent in the characteristics of the Manifestation of God, but instead attributed to the various worldly, societal and human factors;  these differences are in accordance with the "conditions" and "varying requirements of the age" and the "spiritual capacity" of humanity.  These differences are seen to be needed since human society has slowly and gradually evolved through higher stages of unification from the family to tribes and then nations.

Thus religious truth is seen to be relative to its recipients and not absolute; while the messengers proclaimed eternal moral and spiritual truths that are renewed by each messenger, they also changed their message to reflect the particular spiritual and material evolution of humanity at the time of the appearance of the messenger. In the Baháʼí view, since humanity's spiritual capacity and receptivity has increased over time, the extent to which these spiritual truths are expounded changes.

Baháʼu'lláh explained that the appearance of successive messengers was like the annual coming of Spring, which brings new life to the world which has come to neglect the teachings of the previous messenger. He also used an analogy of the world as the human body, and revelation as a robe of "justice and wisdom".

Baháʼu'lláh mentioned in the Kitáb-i-Íqán that God will renew the "City of God" about every thousand years, and specifically mentioned that a new Manifestation of God would not appear within 1000 years of Baháʼu'lláh's message.

Religion as a school
The earliest forms of religion are seen, in many of the Baháʼí Writings, to be like early school. In this view humanity, like a child, has been maturing with a greater ability to grasp complex ideas as it grows in years and passes school.  Each time a divine messenger appears, the message was given at levels appropriate to humanity's degree of maturation. In this view each different religion may have had truth explained differently according to the needs of the recipients of the teaching.

Covenant

Covenant in the Baháʼí Faith refers to two separate binding agreements between God and man. There is a distinction between a Greater Covenant which is made between every messenger from God and his followers concerning the next dispensation, and a Lesser Covenant that concerns successorship of authority within the religion after the messenger dies.

The greater covenant refers to the covenant made between each messenger from God, which the literature of the Baháʼí Faith name Manifestations of God, and his followers regarding the coming of the next Manifestation from God. According to Baháʼu'lláh God has promised that he will send a succession of messengers that will instruct humankind.  In Baháʼí belief, this covenant is seen to be expressed in prophecy in the religious scripture of each religion, and each Manifestation of God, such as Abraham, Moses, Jesus, Muhammad, the Báb, and Baháʼu'lláh, prophesied the next Manifestation.  In return, the followers of each religion are seen to have a duty to investigate the claims of the following Manifestations.

The lesser covenant is a covenant that concerns the recognition of the messenger, acceptance and application of his teachings and laws made regarding the successorship of authority within the religion. In Baháʼí belief the manner in which the Covenant of Baháʼu'lláh was clearly put forth is seen as being a fundamental defining feature of the religion and a powerful protector of the unity of the Baháʼí Faith and its adherents.

Social principles

The following principles are frequently listed as a quick summary of the Baháʼí teachings. They are derived from transcripts of speeches given by ʻAbdu'l-Bahá during his tour of Europe and North America in 1912. The list is not authoritative and a variety of such lists circulate.

Equality of women and men

The Baháʼí Faith affirms gender equality; that men and women are equal. Baháʼu'lláh noted that there was no distinction in the spiritual stations of men and women. ʻAbdu'l-Bahá wrote that both men and women possess the same potential for virtues and intelligence, and compared the two genders and the progress of civilization to the two wings of a bird where each wing is needed to provide flight. In this sense, the equality of the sexes is seen as Baháʼís as a spiritual and moral standard that is essential for the unification of the planet and the unfoldment of world order, and in the importance of implementing the principle in individual, family, and community life.

While the Baháʼí teachings assert the full spiritual and social equality of women to men, there are some aspects of gender distinctiveness or gender differentiation in certain areas of life. Men and women are seen as having different strength and abilities that enable them to better fill different roles. Thus there are certain teachings that give preference to men in some limited circumstances and some that give preference to women. One of these aspects relate to biological fact of potential motherhood for women, and thus the Baháʼí teaching that girls should be given priority in education as they potentially would be the children's first educator. In terms of Baháʼí administration, all positions except for membership on the Universal House of Justice are open to men and women.  No specific reason has been given for this exception, but ʻAbdu'l-Bahá has stated that there is a wisdom for it, which would eventually become clear. Regardless rates of women serving at national levels of governance in the religion exceed those in general society: in 2010 the world average for female members of parliaments was 19%, while the world average of women serving on national assemblies had reached rates of 39%.

Harmony of religion and science

The harmony of science and religion is a central tenet of the Baháʼí teachings.  The principle states that that truth is one, and therefore true science and true religion must be in harmony, thus rejecting the view that science and religion are in conflict. ʻAbdu'l-Bahá asserted that science without religion leads to materialism, and religion without science leads to superstition; he also affirmed that reasoning powers are required to understand the truths of religion. ʻAbdu'l-Bahá condemned civilizations based solely on materialistic beliefs which he said would bring about moral problems.

Universal compulsory education

The theme of education in the Baháʼí Faith is given quite prominent emphasis. Its literature gives a principle of universal, or compulsory education. The Baháʼí teachings focus on promoting a moral and spiritual education, in addition to the arts, trades, sciences and professions.  Baháʼu'lláh wrote that the spiritual capacities of each individual could not be achieved without spiritual education, and thus children needed to have spiritual/religious education from an early stage.  He also stressed the importance of secular education in that one's work and vocation is socially important.  The Baháʼí teachings state it is the obligation of the parents to provide for the education of their children, and that special importance should be given to the education of girls.

Universal auxiliary language

As part of the focus on the unity of humankind, the Baháʼí teachings see improved communication between peoples throughout the world as a vital part of world unity and peace. The Baháʼí teachings see the current multiplicity of languages as a major impediment to unity, since the existence of so many languages cuts the free flow of information and makes it difficult for the average individual to obtain a universal perspective on world events.

Baháʼu'lláh taught that the lack of a common language is a major barrier to world unity since the lack of communication between peoples of different languages undermines efforts toward world peace due to misunderstandings of language; he urged that humanity should choose an auxiliary language that would be taught in schools in addition to one's own native language, so that people could understand one another. He stated that until an auxiliary language is adopted, complete unity between the various parts of the world would continue to be unrealized.

Baháʼu'lláh stressed, however, that the auxiliary language should not suppress existing natural languages, and that the concept of unity in diversity must be applied to languages. The Baháʼí teachings state that cultural heterogeneity is compatible with unity, and that at the present time in the history of humankind, the Baháʼí teaching of unity requires the embracing of cultural diversity since humanity is enriched by the various cultures throughout the world. The Baháʼí teachings also state that having an international auxiliary language would remove the pressure from the natural aggrandizement of majority language groups and thus preserve minority languages, since each person would keep their own mother-tongue, and thus minority cultures.

Elimination of extremes of wealth and poverty
The teachings of the Baháʼí Faith state that it is necessary to eliminate the extremes of wealth and poverty. ʻAbdu'l-Bahá noted both poverty and extreme wealth disallowed for a compassionate society, as poverty demoralized people and extreme wealth overburdened people. Baháʼu'lláh wrote that rich should take care of the poor, as the poor are a divine trust.  The Baháʼí teachings state of multiple ways of addressing the extremes of wealth and poverty including institutional means, such as Huqúqu'lláh, as well as creating a sense of mutual concern.

While the Baháʼí teachings promote the elimination of extremes of wealth and poverty they do not promote communism and instead legitimize individual property. ʻAbdu'l-Bahá further noted that wealth by itself was not evil, and could be used for good.

Independent investigation of truth
Baháʼu'lláh taught that every individual must investigate truth for themselves, not blindly following the beliefs of others or relying upon superstition and tradition as sources of knowledge. This principle is a fundamental obligation. The Baháʼí writings state that, to truly investigate truth, we must abandon our prejudices and that, since the essential Truth underlying reality is one, independent investigation will also be a powerful step towards the oneness of humanity.

Regarding whether or not the use of reason is a valid tool for the independent investigation of truth, Bahá'í scholar Ian Kluge argues that the religion prescribes a form of 'moderate rationalism'. He describes his interpretation of the Bahá'í teachings, writing that, "reason can tell us some things but not others; it has the ability to provide some knowledge but it also has limits". He summarises this with the phrase "reason is necessary but not sufficient". Abdu'l Baha writes that  reason and the powers of the intellect are "fortified into true conclusions and perfect knowledge" only when combined with "the illumination of the Holy Spirit".

Baháʼís are encouraged to meditate and reflect daily on the Baháʼí writings in what has been termed "an eternal or unending process" of seeking the truth. Shoghi Effendi asserts that Baha'u'llah "does not ask us to follow Him blindly" and encourages Baháʼís to "Read His words, consider His teachings, and measure their value in the light of contemporary problems". Abdu'l Baha further emphasises that “God has given us rational minds for this purpose, to penetrate all things, to find truth”.

Wolfgang Klebel emphasises the harmony of the intellect and the heart in his interpretation of the Baháʼí teachings, writing that "Clearly we need both, a pure heart and clear mind" and that unless the heart is pure, it could "contaminate logical reason or even pervert it". A special emphasis is given to the heart in the Baha'i writings on independent investigation. The Baháʼí writings frequently ask the seeker of truth to “Ponder this in thine heart" and Abdu'l Baha writes, “May your hearts become clear and pure like unto polished mirrors in which may be reflected the full glory of the Sun of Truth”. The heart is also seen as the arena in which apparent contradictions are dispelled. The Báb writes that “That which is beyond these two extremes, which is the Middle Path … can be comprehended by naught save the heart. God hath created the heart to understand His unity and transcendence, and it is through the heart that Divine Unity can be witnessed at the level of action.”   While it is assumed by some that there is an opposition between heart and mind or faith and reason, Baháʼís believe that these are false dichotomies based on inadequate descriptions of both faith and reason. For example, Baha'u'llah redefines faith stating that "The essence of faith is fewness of words and abundance of deeds”  and Abdu'l Baha further comments that "sincerity is the foundation-stone of faith. That is, a religious individual must disregard his personal desires and seek in whatever way he can wholeheartedly to serve the public interest". Abdu'l Baha also writes that, “If religion is opposed to reason and science, faith is impossible; and when faith and confidence in the divine religion are not manifest in the heart, there can be no spiritual attainment.” 

At the age of fifteen, children brought up in a Baháʼí family are enjoined to investigate different spiritual traditions and are free to choose whether or not they want to remain a Baháʼí. Bahá'ís are forbidden from communicating with Covenant-breakers and discouraged from reading their literature. Additionally, when Bahá'ís publish independent scholarship, the Bahá'í administration requires them to submit their writing for "Baháʼí review," wherein Baháʼís submit their material for vetting before it is published to ensure credibility from the administration's understanding, a practice which has been criticized by Juan Cole.

Spiritual teachings

The Bahá'í writings contain many references to spiritual qualities and values that individuals should strive to develop. The elements of good character include, among others, trustworthiness, truthfulness, faithfulness, sincerity, purity of motivation, service, justice, moderation, cleanliness, dignity and avoiding backbiting, balanced by reason and knowledge.

God is described in the Baháʼí writings a single, personal, inaccessible, omniscient, omnipresent, imperishable, and almighty God who is the creator of all things in the universe.  The existence of God and the universe is thought to be eternal, without a beginning or end.  The Baháʼí teachings state that God is too great for humans to fully comprehend, or to create a complete and accurate image of, by themselves. Therefore, human understanding of God is achieved through his revelations via his Manifestations. In the Baháʼí religion God is often referred to by titles and attributes (e.g. the All-Powerful, or the All-Loving), and there is a substantial emphasis on monotheism. The Baháʼí teachings state that the attributes which are applied to God are used to translate Godliness into human terms and also to help individuals concentrate on their own attributes in worshipping God to develop their potentialities on their spiritual path. According to the Baháʼí teachings the human purpose is to learn to know and love God through such methods as prayer, reflection and being of service to humankind.

The Baháʼí writings state that human beings have a "rational soul", and that this provides the species with a unique capacity to recognize God's station and humanity's relationship with its creator.  Every human is seen to have a duty to recognize God through His messengers, and to conform to their teachings. Through recognition and obedience, service to humanity and regular prayer and spiritual practice, the Baháʼí writings state that the soul becomes closer to God, the spiritual ideal in Baháʼí belief. When a human dies, the soul passes into the next world, where its spiritual development in the physical world becomes a basis for judgment and advancement in the spiritual world. Baháʼís' believe in the eternal life of the soul rather than reincarnation. Heaven and Hell are taught to be spiritual states of nearness or distance from God that describe relationships in this world and the next, and not physical places of reward and punishment achieved after death.

Organization

"Baháʼí administration" or "Baháʼí administrative order" is the administrative system of the religion which directly rests on the teachings of the religion penned by its central figures – especially Baháʼu'lláh and ʻAbdu'l-Bahá. It is split into two parts, the elected and the appointed. The supreme governing institution of the Baháʼí Faith is the Universal House of Justice, situated in Haifa, Israel.

The Baháʼí administration has four charter scriptural documents,
Kitáb-i-Aqdas
Tablets of the Divine Plan
Tablet of Carmel
Will and Testament of ʻAbdu'l-Bahá

Consultation as a process for resolving differences
Key to the function of Baháʼí organization is the principle of consultation. This refers to the method of non-adversarial discussion and decision-making which is described in the Baháʼí writings, and which is used in all levels of Baháʼí administration. Consultation strives to move beyond a decision making process that accepts the majority view, to one that aims to discover truth through universal participation and disciplined cooperation.

See also
Baháʼí laws
Baháʼí literature
Criticism of the Baháʼí Faith
Outline of the Baháʼí Faith
Ruhi Institute
Socio-economic development (Baháʼí)

Notes

References

Further reading
Primary sources

Secondary sources

External links
 Bahai.org: What Baháʼís Believe
 Compilations of Baháʼí writings about various subjects
 The Loom of Reality, thematic compilations of quotations from the Bahá’í Writings and beyond
 

 

he:הדת הבהאית#עקרונות הדת